Roman Square may refer to:
 Roman Square (Podgorica), a square in Podgorica, Montenegro
 Piața Romană or Roman Square, a square in Bucharest, Romania